Jing-Song Huang is a Chair Professor in the Department of Mathematics of Hong Kong University of Science and Technology. His research interests are representations of Lie groups and harmonic analysis. After graduating from Peking University, he went to Massachusetts Institute of Technology and received his PhD degree in 1989, under the supervision of David Vogan.

Joint with Pavle Pandzic from University of Zagreb, Croatia, Huang proved a conjecture of David Vogan on Dirac cohomology, published in the Journal of the American Mathematical Society.

Selected publications

Awards and honors
Huang was a recipient of the State Natural Science Award of China (second class) in 2002, and Senior Research Fellowship in 2004 by the Croucher Foundation.

References

Living people
Academic staff of the Hong Kong University of Science and Technology
Peking University alumni
Year of birth missing (living people)